The North Dakota Republican Party is the North Dakota affiliate of the United States Republican Party.

Its platform is conservative. It is currently the dominant party in the state, controlling North Dakota's at-large U.S. House seat, both U.S. Senate seats, the governorship, and has supermajorities in both houses of the state legislature.

History
The state Republican Party has always been a major force in state politics, in many cases having a dominant position. Founded in 1889, the Party initially dominated all state politics for the state's first 20 years of existence, with the exception of a brief period from 1893 to 1894 in which the North Dakota Democratic-Independent Party briefly overthrew the Republican Party.

In the early 20th century, the Party was effectively divided into two groups that nominated candidates on the Republican ticket, the progressive Non-Partisan League (NPL) and the conservative Independent Voters Association (IVA).  This period ended when the NPL merged with the state Democratic Party, and the IVA effectively became known as the Republican Party.

The Party holds its convention in the spring of election years, usually rotating the convention between four of the state's largest cities: Bismarck, Fargo, Grand Forks, and Minot.

Notable figures
Thomas S. Kleppe (1919-2007) - former United States Secretary of the Interior
Milton Young - United States Senator who served as President pro tempore for a day
Mark Andrews - former United States Senator
Ed Schafer - former Governor of North Dakota and former United States Secretary of Agriculture
Allen Olson - former Governor of North Dakota

Current elected officials
The North Dakota Republican Party controls all twelve of the statewide offices and holds supermajorities in both the North Dakota Senate and the North Dakota House of Representatives. Republicans also hold both of the state's U.S. Senate seats and the state's At-Large congressional district.

Members of Congress

U.S. Senate

U.S. House of Representatives

Statewide offices

Insurance Commissioner: Jon Godfread
Tax Commissioner: Brian Kroshus
Auditor: Josh Gallion
North Dakota State Treasurer: Thomas Beadle
North Dakota Agriculture Commissioner: Doug Goehring 
Public Service Commissioners: Brian Kroshus, Julie Fedorchak, Randy Christmann

Legislative
President Pro Tempore of the Senate: Larry Luick
Senate Majority Leader: Rich Wardner
Speaker of the House: Kim Koppelman
House Majority Leader: Chet Pollert

Election results

Presidential

Gubernatorial

See also
North Dakota Democratic-NPL Party - North Dakota affiliate of the Democratic Party
Political party strength in North Dakota
Politics of North Dakota
Republican Party (United States)

References

External links

Republican Party (United States) by state
Politics of North Dakota
Political parties in North Dakota